Augustine Washington Sr. (November 12, 1694 – April 12, 1743) was the father of the first U.S. president, George Washington. He belonged to the Colony of Virginia's landed gentry. Like his father and sons, Washington owned plantations which he operated by the use of enslaved labor, as well as speculated in less developed land and even operated an iron mine. Although Washington did not serve as a legislator (unlike his father and son), he held various offices in the counties in which he held land.

Early and family life
Augustine Washington was born in Westmoreland County, Virginia, on November 12, 1694, to Mildred Warner and her husband, Capt. Lawrence Washington, a militia captain and a member of the Virginia House of Burgesses. His paternal grandparents were Lt. Col. John Washington (c. 1631–1677) and his first wife, Anne Pope. His maternal grandparents owned Warner Hall and associated plantations in Gloucester County.

Augustine was four years old when his father died. His mother remarried and moved her family to England, where she died when all were still children; although their mother's will named their stepfather George Gale as  their guardian, their cousin John Washington fought to have himself named the children's guardian and brought them back to Virginia. 

The young couple settled on the Bridges Creek property and had four children, only two of whom (Lawrence and Augustine Jr.) lived to adulthood. After Jane's death in November 1728 or 1729, Washington married Mary Ball in 1731, and the couple had five children who survived to adulthood — George, Betty, Samuel, Charles, and John Augustine — and a daughter named Mildred who died in infancy.

Career
In 1718, Washington purchased land on Pope's Creek, adjoining his property on Bridges Creek, and set about establishing himself. Between 1723 and 1735 he hired a local contractor to build a house, which was probably completed about 1726 despite the contractors death (later called Wakefield). In the same year, Washington purchased the Little Hunting Creek property from his sister Mildred.

In 1725, Augustine Washington entered into an agreement with the Principio Company of England to start an iron works on Accokeek Creek in Stafford County, and he also owned a stake in their Maryland ironworks. In 1735, the family moved to the Little Hunting Creek property, which was closer to the Accokeek Furnace.

In 1738, Augustine Washington purchased the 150-acre Strother property across the Rappahannock River (now known as Ferry Farm) and moved the family there at the end of that same year.

Augustine Washington was active in the Anglican Church, the local militia and politics. He took the oath as justice of the peace for the Westmoreland county court in July 1716, and served as county sheriff.

Death and legacy
After Augustine Washington died in 1743 at the age of 48, his 11-year old son George inherited the former Strother property and its slaves. Because he had not reached legal age, his mother Mary managed this property for him until he came of age. She lived on the property until 1772 when she was 64, when George moved her to a house in Fredericksburg.

Lawrence Washington inherited the Little Hunting Creek property and renamed it "Mount Vernon," to honor Admiral Edward Vernon, with whom he had served in the Royal Navy in 1741 during the Battle of Cartagena de Indias during the War of Jenkins' Ear.

According to Augustine Sr's will, if his son Lawrence died without children, the Little Hunting Creek property would go to Augustine Jr. and Augustine Jr, in turn, would have to give up the Popes Creek property to his brother George. If Augustine Jr. did not want the Little Hunting Creek property, it would then be inherited by George. Upon Lawrence's death Augustine Jr. chose Popes Creek and its slaves rather than the former Little Hunting Creek property. Lawrence's only surviving child Sarah only lived until 1754; therefore, George Washington ultimately inherited the Little Hunting Creek property which by that time was known as Mount Vernon. At his death, Augustine Washington Sr. held a total of 64 slaves who were assigned among the various plantations.

Lawrence Washington's widow Ann had a life interest in the Little Hunting Creek plantation. Because she remarried and was not living at Mount Vernon, she leased the property to George beginning in 1754. Upon her death in 1761, George Washington inherited the plantation outright.

Children (by Jane Butler)
 Butler Washington (1716–1716)
 Lawrence Washington (1718–1752)
 Augustine Washington Jr. (1720–1762)
 Jane Washington (1722–1735)

Children (by Mary Ball)
 George Washington (1732–1799), the first president of the United States
 Elizabeth "Betty" Washington (1733–1797)
 Samuel Washington (1734–1781)
 John Augustine Washington (1736–1787)
 Charles Washington (1738–1799)
 Mildred Washington (1739–1740)

See also
 Washington family

Notes

References

External links
 "George Washington's Heritage", March 26, 2005, Fredericksburg.com.
 "Lawrence Washington History, 1659-1698", National Park Service

1694 births
1743 deaths
British planters
Augustine 
Fathers of presidents of the United States
British North American Anglicans
People from Westmoreland County, Virginia
Mount Vernon
British slave owners
People educated at Appleby Grammar School